Kuseh Ali may refer to:
 Kus Ali
 Kalleh-ye Nahr Mian